The Dream Is Over is the second album by Canadian punk rock band PUP, released on May 27, 2016, through Royal Mountain Records in Canada and SideOneDummy Records worldwide. The album was recorded with the financial support of Canada's Private Radio Broadcasters. The album title comes from the doctor of lead singer Stefan Babcock, after the doctor found out about a problem with Babcock's vocal cords.

The song "DVP" was featured in the video game Dream Daddy: A Dad Dating Simulator. The band themselves also make a cameo in the game.

Critical reception

Exclaim!s Adam Feibel gave the album a positive review, calling it "youthfully sassy and sarcastic in one breath and introspectively mature in another".

 Accolades 

Track listing

Charts

PersonnelPUP Stefan Babcock – lead vocals and rhythm guitar
 Zack Mykula – drums, background vocals and percussion
 Steve Sladkowski – lead guitar and background vocals
 Nestor Chumak – bass and background vocalsAdditional musician Graham Wright – piano on "If This Tour Doesn't Kill You, I Will"Production'
 Dave Schiffman – recording and mixing
 Alex Gamble – recording assistant
 John Dinsmore – recording assistant
 Masumi Kaneko – recording assistant
 Howie Weinberg – mastering at Howie Weinberg Mastering Studio, Los Angeles
 Christopher McKenny – cover image
 Jessica Flynn – inside photo

References

PUP (band) albums
2016 albums
SideOneDummy Records albums
Royal Mountain Records albums